The 1942 Western Kentucky State Teachers Hilltoppers football team represented Western Kentucky State Teachers College (now known as Western Kentucky University) as a member of the Kentucky Intercollegiate Athletic Conference (KIAC) during the 1942 college football season. Led by Arnold Winkenhofer in his first and only season as head coach, the Hilltoppers compiled an overall record of 3–4–1 with a mark of 2–0–1 in conference play.

Schedule

References

Western Kentucky State Teachers
Western Kentucky Hilltoppers football seasons
Western Kentucky State Teachers Hilltoppers football